Kaboom is a 2010 American comedy-drama film written and directed by Gregg Araki and starring Thomas Dekker, Juno Temple, Haley Bennett, and James Duval.

A science fiction story centered on the sexual adventures of a group of college students and their investigation of a bizarre cult, the film premiered at the 2010 Cannes Film Festival, where it was awarded the first ever Queer Palm for its contribution to lesbian, gay, bisexual or transgender issues.

Plot
Smith, an 18-year-old film student who identifies sexually as "undeclared," has been having strange dreams recently. He is going to college with his best friend, Stella, whom he has known since junior high, and finds a note saying he is the "chosen son." He has a roommate named Thor, whom he lusts after even though Thor is straight. Smith and Stella go to a party where Stella hooks up with a girl named Lorelei, who Smith recognizes from one of his dreams. Later, a red-haired girl vomits on his shoe, and Smith also recognizes her from a dream. Smith eventually gets picked up by London, a British student. They have sex, but to Smith's chagrin, she does not want to be with him except during sex.

Smith visits a nude beach and meets a man named Hunter. They start having sex, but Smith is disappointed to hear Hunter is married. Stella discovers Lorelei is not only unstable, but a witch with psychic problems caused by rejection. Stella keeps trying to dump her but has difficulty as Lorelei begins trying to kill her. Smith walks in on Thor and Thor's best friend, Rex, wrestling in their underwear. London seduces Rex, convincing him to have a three-way with her and Smith for Smith's 19th birthday.

During this time, Smith continues dreaming of the red-haired girl. In his dreams, they are both pursued by people wearing animal masks. Smith finds out that a girl was killed and her head cut off. He later meets Madeline, who appears to be the same red-haired girl. She tells him that she had a twin sister named Rebecca who was kidnapped many years ago by men wearing animal masks. Stella is attacked by Lorelei in a bathroom, but saves herself by spraying water on her, causing Lorelei to burn up.

The animal-masked people finally capture Smith, London, and Smith's mom. They are bundled into a van to be driven to meet the head of a secret cult. Smith learns that the cult leader is his father, although he was always told that his father died when Smith was young. The three also learn London is another child of the cult leader, making her and Smith half-siblings.

Stella, Oliver, and the perpetually stoned "Messiah" pursue the van. Oliver has powers like Lorelei's but uses them for good. It turns out that Oliver meeting Smith (and flirting with him) was not chance; he was trying to protect Smith from the cult. The Messiah was only acting stoned as a cover and also wishes to protect Smith. The animal-masked people turn out to be Thor, Rex, and Hunter, whose mission is to get London and Smith to a secret underground shelter to survive the explosion of dozens of nuclear bombs. Non-cult members will be annihilated, and the cult will take over the world with Smith as its leader.

The Messiah tries running the van off the road, and both vehicles accelerate towards a bridge that is out. Smith's father presses a button and the Earth explodes.

Cast

 Thomas Dekker as Smith
 Juno Temple as London
 Haley Bennett as Stella
 Roxane Mesquida as Lorelei/Laura
 Brennan Mejia as Oliver
 James Duval as The Messiah
 Kelly Lynch as Nicole
 Chris Zylka as Thor
 Nicole LaLiberte as Madeleine O'Hara/Rebecca Novak
 Andy Fischer-Price as Rex
 Jason Olive as Hunter
 Carlo Mendez as Milo
 Brandy Futch as Drug Fairy Nymph

Reception
The film received mixed reviews from critics.  On Metacritic, the film has a 64/100 rating from 24 reviews, indicating "generally favorable reviews".

Bruce DeMara from the Toronto Star praised the film's cast and called it "Araki's most ambitious [movie] to date, with a quick pace, music that's hip and cool and a mood that alternates between playful and eccentric." Sam Adams from the Los Angeles Times was much more critical about it, and said it was "less a movie than a masturbatory doodle, a sloppy, shoddy regurgitation of Araki's pet trope that tries to pass off its slipshod structure as a free-wheeling lark."

References

External links
 
 
 
 

2010 films
2010 independent films
2010 LGBT-related films
American independent films
American LGBT-related films
Bisexuality-related films
2010s English-language films
Films about cults
Films about dreams
Films directed by Gregg Araki
Films produced by Andrea Sperling
Films set in universities and colleges
Films shot in Los Angeles
English-language French films
French independent films
French LGBT-related films
Gay-related films
Incest in film
Lesbian-related films
LGBT-related black comedy films
LGBT-related science fiction comedy-drama films
LGBT-related sex comedy films
Queer Palm winners
American science fiction comedy-drama films
French science fiction comedy-drama films
American psychological drama films
French psychological drama films
2010s science fiction comedy-drama films
LGBT-related coming-of-age films
2010s American films
2010s French films
Male bisexuality in film